FCE Atsinanana is a Malagasy football club who currently plays in  the THB Champions League the top division of Malagasy football.
The team is based in the Atsinanana region in eastern Madagascar.

Stadium
Currently the team plays at the 2500 capacity Stade Municipal de Toamasina.

References

General
Soccerway
Madagascar 2013

Atsinanana